Jerry-Christian Tchuissé (born 13 January 1975) is a Cameroonian and Russian former professional footballer who played as a fullback. He played club football in Russia for Chernomorets Novorossiysk, Spartak Moscow, FC Moscow, FC Terek Grozny and FC Vityaz Podolsk.

Club career
In 1997, after playing some amateur football in Cameroon, Tchuisse moved to Russia. After unsuccessfully trying to get into a university in Krasnodar, Tchuisse was spotted by the coach of an amateur side "Neftyannik", from the nearby Goryachy Klyuch, while playing football with his friends. Less than half a year later, his impressive displays for the Krasnodar Krai team, at an exhibition event, earned him his first professional contract and a move to the Russian Top Division (as it was known at the time) side Chernomorets Novorossiysk.

During his time at Novorossiysk, Tchuisse received a career-threatening injury, after a bad challenge by Valery Kechinov. Tchuisse recovered and soon signed for the league champions Spartak Moscow.

With Spartak, the Cameroonian won two domestic league titles. In 2000, Tchuisse made his European debut in the UEFA Champions League and He was granted Russian citizenship in this year by Vladimir Poutine and was considered for the Russian national team. The fans saw him as a potential counterpart to Nigerian international Emmanuel Olisadebe.Even a number 21 jersey was prepared especially for Tchuise, which was going to be given to him before the Spartak-CSKA match on March 31, 2001. However, he never played in it. On 6 May 2001 he made his debut for the Cameroon national team, where he was also called up.
Tense relations with his teammates, however, forced the player to look for a move away. Tchuisse was linked with a possible move to RC Lensor Shaktar Donetsk, but no deal ever materialized and the player, eventually, returned to Chernomorets Novorossiysk. After the club's relegation to the Russian First Division, Tchuisse received an offer from the newly formed ambitious FC Moscow.

During this three-year spell at the Moscow club, Tchuisse scored his first professional goal. His two goals for FC Moscow still remain his only goals scored for a professional club.

In 2007 and 2008, he played for FC Terek Grozny and FC Vityaz Podolsk respectively.

Tchuissé currently resides in Le Mans, France. There he coaches a local team, Le Mans villaret, and has business in Cameroon.

International career and trophies
Tchuissé obtained Russian citizenship in 2000 after meeting with Vladimir Putin and was a candidate to play for the Russia national team. He even participated in team training. However, he has not played for Russia and debuted for Cameroon on 6 May 2001. 

He won during his career two championship of Russia 2000, 2001 and a cup of Russia 2003.

References

External links

http://www.video-soccer.com/match.php?match=3005
http://www.video-soccer.com/section.php
 Club profile 
 Personal website 
http://www.cameroon-info.net/article/football-christian-tchuisse-le-lion-tsar-de-russie-60174.html
https://www.camfoot.com/interview/interview-eric-matoukou-et,5748.html

1975 births
Living people
Footballers from Douala
Cameroonian footballers
Russian footballers
Russian people of Cameroonian descent
Naturalised citizens of Russia
FC Chernomorets Novorossiysk players
FC Spartak Moscow players
FC Moscow players
FC Akhmat Grozny players
Cameroon international footballers
Russian Premier League players
Expatriate footballers in Russia
FC Vityaz Podolsk players
Association football defenders